Virginia Ruby Andersen (born 1975) is a New Zealand politician and Member of Parliament in the House of Representatives for the Labour Party.

Personal life
Andersen lives in Belmont, Lower Hutt. Bill Andersen, a noted activist and trade union leader, was her great-uncle. Ginny Andersen worked for the New Zealand Police as a policy unit manager from 2006 to 2017. Prior to that, she worked at the Office of Treaty Settlements and was also a private secretary and senior political adviser in Parliament to several Labour MPs including Trevor Mallard, David Cunliffe, Mark Burton, and Margaret Wilson. Andersen is married to Geoff Gwyn, a former police inspector.

Political career
Andersen served as the Labour Party's Vice-President from 2015 to 2017, when she stood down to focus on her parliamentary candidacy.

Member of parliament

She replaced long-serving member of parliament Trevor Mallard as the Labour Party candidate who had, in July of that year, said he would serve as a list-only candidate for the election with the intention of becoming Speaker of the House. In the previous election Mallard had won Hutt South by only 709 votes (1.83%) over National's candidate, Chris Bishop. Andersen was ranked 28 on Labour's party list, an increase of 9 from 2014. While Andersen lost the Hutt South election to Bishop, she entered parliament via the party list under New Zealand's MMP electoral system.

Andersen was Labour's Hutt South candidate for the 2020 New Zealand general election, and dropped 17 places to 45 on Labour's list.

During the 2020 election which was held on 17 October, Andersen captured Hutt South, defeating incumbent Bishop by a final margin of 3,777 votes.

In March 2021 Andersen admitted she knew about a secretive rent deal that saw $4500 in taxpayer cash funnelled into the local Labour Party each year. She’d previously said she only understood the deal after she “looked at it” ahead of the 2020 election. The deal worked through a subletting arrangement whereby the local Labour Party rented office space from the building’s owner, the New Zealand Professional Firefighters Union, for $1500 a year. It then sublet that office to Andersen for her MP’s duties, for $6000.

She was chosen as the Minister for the Digital Economy and Communications, Minister for Small Business, Minister for Seniors, Associate Minister of Immigration and the Associate Minister for Treaty of Waitangi Negotiations in a cabinet reshuffle by Prime Minister Chris Hipkins on 31 January 2023. 

Following Stuart Nash's resignation as Police Minister, she was appointed as Minister of Police by Prime Minister Chris Hipkins on 20 March 2023.

References

External links
 

|-

|-

|-

|-

|-

1975 births
Living people
New Zealand Labour Party MPs
Members of the New Zealand House of Representatives
New Zealand list MPs
Women members of the New Zealand House of Representatives
Unsuccessful candidates in the 2014 New Zealand general election
Candidates in the 2017 New Zealand general election
Candidates in the 2020 New Zealand general election
Members of the Cabinet of New Zealand
Women government ministers of New Zealand